Cameron de Burgh (born 11 April 1971) is an Australian Paralympic swimmer, who has won four medals at two Paralympics.

Personal
De Burgh was born in New Zealand on 11 April 1971, and moved to Brisbane in Australia in 1991. At the age of 16, his trail-bike was hit by a car while he was performing a U-turn and his right leg was amputated above the knee due to his injuries. Four months after the accident, he began an apprenticeship at a golf course.

Swimming

De Burgh started swimming in the early 1990s. In 1995, he won five gold medals at the Australian National Swimming Championships. He won a silver medal at the 1996 Atlanta Games in the Men's 4x100 m Freestyle S7–10 event. In the freestyle and butterfly events at the 1996 Games, he set Australian records. He was a 1997 and 1998 Motor Accidents Authority Paralympian. In 1998, he competed at the IPC Swimming World Championships in Christchurch. In the 100 m freestyle and 100 m butterfly events, he won silver medals. At the Championship, he was part of the Australian 4 x 100 m relay team that won a gold medal. In 1999, he competed in the German and United Kingdom national swimming championships. His medal haul at these two events included five gold medals, a silver medal and a bronze medal. In 2000, his competitive sport participation was sponsored by the Motor Accidents Authority in New South Wales. At the 2000 Sydney Paralympics, he won two silver medals in the Men's 100 m Freestyle S9 and Men's 4x100 m Freestyle 34 pts events and a bronze medal in the Men's 4x100 m Medley 34 pts event.

Recognition
In 1995, the Australian Paralympic Federation named De Burgh their Developing Paralympian of the Year.

References

Male Paralympic swimmers of Australia
Swimmers at the 1996 Summer Paralympics
Swimmers at the 2000 Summer Paralympics
Medalists at the 1996 Summer Paralympics
Medalists at the 2000 Summer Paralympics
Paralympic silver medalists for Australia
Paralympic bronze medalists for Australia
Amputee category Paralympic competitors
Australian amputees
New Zealand amputees
New Zealand emigrants to Australia
Swimmers from Brisbane
1971 births
Living people
Paralympic medalists in swimming
Australian male freestyle swimmers
S9-classified Paralympic swimmers